Count Francesco Algarotti (11 December 1712 – 3 May 1764) was an Italian polymath, philosopher, poet, essayist, anglophile, art critic and art collector. He was a man of broad knowledge, an expert in Newtonianism, architecture and opera. He was a friend of Frederick the Great and leading authors of his times: Voltaire, Jean-Baptiste de Boyer, Marquis d'Argens, Pierre-Louis de Maupertuis and the atheist Julien Offray de La Mettrie. Lord Chesterfield, Thomas Gray, George Lyttelton, Thomas Hollis, Metastasio, Benedict XIV and Heinrich von Brühl were among his correspondents.

Early life
Algarotti was born in Venice as the son of a rich merchant. His father and uncle were art collectors. Unlike his older brother, Bonomo he did not step into the company, but decided to become an author. Francesco obtained a classical education; also studied natural sciences and mathematics in Rome. While the experimental physics and medicine at University of Bologna under Francesco Maria Zanotti and in 1728, he experimented with optics. (Zanotti became a lifelong friend.) He was educated in his native Venice and in Rome and Bologna. His youthful curiosity led him to travel extensively, and he visited Paris for the first time in his early 20s. There his urbanity, his brilliant conversation, his good looks, and his versatile intelligence promptly made an impression on such intellectuals as Pierre-Louis Moreau de Maupertuis and Voltaire. Two years later, he was in London, where he was made a fellow of the Royal Society. He became embroiled in a lively bisexual love-triangle with the politician John Hervey, and Lady Mary Wortley Montagu. Algarotti left for Italy and finished his Neutonianismo per le dame ("Newtonism for Ladies") (1737 – dedicated to Bernard le Bovier de Fontenelle) – a work consisting of information on astronomy, physics, mathematics, women and science and education.

Personal life and career 
Algarotti had made acquaintance with Antiochus Kantemir, a Moldavian diplomat, poet and composer. He was invited to visit Russia for the wedding of Duke Anthony Ulrich of Brunswick. In 1739 he left with Lord Baltimore from Sheerness to Newcastle upon Tyne. Because of a heavy storm the ship sheltered in Harlingen. Algarotti was discovering "this new city", which he called the great window ... to which Russia looks on Europe. Returning from Saint Petersburg, they visited Frederick the Great in Rheinsberg. Algarotti had obligations in England and came back the year after. Then Algarotti went together with Frederick to Königsberg where he was crowned.

Frederick, who was impressed with this walking encyclopedia, made him and his brother Bonomo Prussian counts in 1740. Algarotti accompanied Frederick to Bayreuth, Kehl, Strasbourg and Moyland Castle where they met with Voltaire, who was taking baths in Kleve for his health. In 1741 Algarotti went to Turin as his diplomat. Frederick had offered him a salary, but Algarotti refused. First, he went to Dresden and Venice, where he bought 21 paintings, a few by Jean-Étienne Liotard and Giovanni Battista Tiepolo for the court of Augustus III of Poland. Algarotti did not succeed in inducing the Kingdom of Sardinia to launch a treacherous attack upon Austria.

Algarotti and the other arts

Algarotti's choice of works reflects the encyclopedic interests of the Neoclassic era; he was uninterested in developing a single unitary stylistic collection, and envisioned a modern museum, a catalog of styles from across the ages. For contemporary commissions, he wrote up a list of paintings he recommended commissioning, including history paintings from Tiepolo, Pittoni, and Piazzetta; scenes with animals from Castiglione, and veduta with ruins from Pannini. He wanted "suggetti graziosi e leggeri" from Balestra, Boucher, and Donato Creti. Other artists he supported were Giuseppe Nogari, Bernardo Bellotto, and Francesco Pavona.

In 1747 Algarotti went back to Potsdam and became court chamberlain, but left to visit the archeological diggings at Herculaneum. In 1749 he moved to Berlin. Algarotti was  involved in finishing the architectural designs of Georg Wenzeslaus von Knobelsdorff who had fallen ill. In February 1753, after several years residing in Prussia, he returned to Italy, living most of the time in Bologna, where he was friendly with Laura Bassi the first salaried female teacher in a university. In 1759 Algarotti was involved in a new opera-style in the city of Parma. He influenced Guillaume du Tillot and the Duke of Parma.

Algarotti's Essay on the Opera (1755) was a major influence on the librettist Carlo Innocenzo Frugoni and the composer Tommaso Traetta, and in the development of Gluck's reformist ideology. Algarotti proposed a heavily simplified model of opera seria, with the drama pre-eminent, instead of the music, ballet or staging. The drama itself should "delight the eyes and ears, to rouse up and to affect the hearts of an audience, without the risk of sinning against reason or common sense". Algarotti's ideas influenced both Gluck and his librettist Calzabigi, writing their Orfeo ed Euridice.

In 1762 Algarotti moved to Pisa, where he died of tuberculosis. Frederick the Great, who several times had needed Algarotti for writing texts in Latin, sent in a text for a monument to his memory on the Campo Santo.

Works
Bibliography and Inventory of all known letters at Algarotti Briefdatenbank der Universitätsbibliothek Trier 
Correspondence with Frederick the Great at Digitale Ausgabe der Universitätsbibliothek Trier 
Il newtonianismo per le dame, 1737. The International Centre for the History of Universities and Science (CIS), University of Bologna
"Saggio sopra la pittura"
"An essay on architecture" (1753).
"Letters military and political" (1782).
"Essai sur la durée des règnes des sept rois de Rome"
"Essai sur l'empire des Incas"

Gallery

References

Sources
 
 
 
 MacDonogh, G. (1999) Frederick the Great. New York: St. Martin's Griffin
 Orrey, Leslie; Milnes, Rodney (1987). Opera, a concise history. London: Thames and Hudson. .
 Occhipinti, C. Piranesi, Mariette, Algarotti. Percorsi settecenteschi nella cultura figurativa europea. Roma, UniversItalia, 2013. 
 Stanford University Databases
 Frieder von Ammon, Jörg Krämer, Florian Mehltretter (eds.): Oper der Aufklärung – Aufklärung der Oper. Francesco Algarottis "Saggio Sopra L'Opera in Musica" im Kontext. Mit einer kommentierten Edition der 5. Fassung des "Saggio" und ihrer Übersetzung durch Rudolf Erich Raspe. Berlin/Boston: De Gruyter 2017, .

External links
 Catalogo dei quadri dei disegni e dei libri che trattano dell' arte del disegno della galleria del fu Sig. conte Algarotti in Venezia (1776)
 Online books by F. Algarotti at The Online Books Page.
 Francesco Algarotti's House in Venice
 
 in Tate Collection at Tate.org.uk
 
 All that glitters by Henk van Os
 Becoming a Scientist: Gender and Knowledge in Eighteenth-Century Italy by Paula Findlen
 Thomas Carlyle on Algarotti
 Rictor Norton, "John, Lord Hervey", section: "Swan of Padua".
 Francesco Algarotti (1739) Il Newtonianismo per le dame. – Linda Hall Library

1712 births
1764 deaths
18th-century philosophers
18th-century Italian philosophers
Italian art critics
Italian art historians
Italian engravers
18th-century Venetian writers
18th-century LGBT people
Italian bisexual people
Italian LGBT poets
Italian art collectors
Fellows of the Royal Society
Recipients of the Pour le Mérite (civil class)
18th-century deaths from tuberculosis
Bisexual artists
Bisexual poets
Bisexual men
Male lovers of royalty
Tuberculosis deaths in Italy
Infectious disease deaths in Tuscany